Zack and Miri Make a Porno (also known simply as Zack and Miri) is a 2008 American sex comedy film written, directed and edited by Kevin Smith and starring Seth Rogen and Elizabeth Banks. It was released on October 31, 2008. The film follows the lives of friends Zack and Miri, who are facing financial troubles and decide to make an adult film to solve their problems. The film was produced by Scott Mosier and was released by The Weinstein Company. It received mixed reviews from critics and was a box office failure.

Plot

Zack Brown and Miriam "Miri" Linky are roommates in Monroeville, Pennsylvania (a Pittsburgh suburb), having been friends since the first grade. Despite their jobs (Miri's at the local shopping mall and Zack's at a coffee shop), their utility bills have been unpaid for months. After work on the night before Thanksgiving, their water is shut off before their high school reunion.

At the reunion, Miri attempts to seduce her attractive former classmate Bobby Long, while Zack converses with Brandon St. Randy, who reveals that he is a gay porn star and Bobby's boyfriend. After they return home from the reunion, the apartment's electricity is turned off. Inspired by Brandon St. Randy and a successful viral video that a pair of teenage boys filmed of Miri changing in Zack's workplace for the reunion (revealing that she wore unattractive "granny panties" underwear), and emboldened by the cultural mainstreaming of pornographic entertainment, Zack convinces a reluctant Miri that they should make a pornographic film to earn money.

Gathering a group of acquaintances and hired help as the cast and crew, they decide to film a pornographic Star Wars parody, entitled Star Whores. Delaney, the film's producer and Zack's co-worker, rents film equipment and a building to use as a studio. When they return to the studio after the first night of filming, the building is being demolished, with all the equipment and costumes inside. They are told that the man that rented it to them has run off with the money. Later at the coffee shop where Zack works, he realizes that his boss threatened to install a hidden camera, which Zack finds and decides to use to replace their lost film equipment. Zack retools his film to take place in the coffee shop, revamping the film to one with a coffee shop motif, Swallow My Cockuccino. The group shoots the film after hours.

Despite insisting that they would not let sex with each other affect their friendship, Zack and Miri soon develop romantic feelings for each other. When it comes time for Zack and Miri to have sex on camera, they find that instead of the clinical sex enacted by the actors in the other scenes, their interlude is romantic and heartfelt. Later the next evening, Zack and Miri are at home tentatively about to discuss their reactions to the scene, when suddenly their apartment's electricity and water service return. The rest of the actors and crew reveal that they pooled their resources to pay one month of the couple's bills and are throwing them an early wrap party.

At the party, one of the other actresses, Stacey, asks Miri about asking Zack to have sex, since she's nervous about her upcoming scene with him. Although Miri has realized that she has developed feelings for Zack, she approves Stacey's request. When Stacey relates this to Zack, the two retreat to Zack's bedroom, much to Miri's dismay.

The next evening, Zack is preparing to film a scene between Stacey and another actor, Lester, that was supposed to have been with Lester and Miri. Zack is dismayed when Miri shows up and insists on shooting the scene as originally planned. In the back room, an incredulous Zack asks if she is doing this to retaliate, pointing out that Stacey told him that Miri did not mind her sleeping with Zack. Miri corrects him, clarifying that she did not mind that Stacey merely offered to sleep with him. Perceiving this to have been some type of test, Zack admits that during the sex scene they filmed together, they were actually making love and were emotionally connected, and that he loves Miri. When Miri does not reciprocate, Zack storms out of the coffee shop, quitting the film and his job, and moves out of the apartment.

Three months later, Delaney goes to see Zack, who has a job dressing in a hockey goon costume and letting people shoot him with paintball guns during Pittsburgh Penguins games. Delaney convinces him to come to Delaney's home to see the unfinished film and help complete it. Zack agrees, and as Delaney and the cameraman Deacon explain, Zack learns that Miri never filmed her sex scene with Lester. Zack goes to Miri's apartment and reveals to her that he never slept with Stacey; instead, they talked about Miri all night. He proclaims his love to Miri, who reciprocates.

In a post-credits scene, Zack and Miri get married and, aided by Delaney and his worker's compensation settlement, start their own video production company, Zack and Miri Make Your Porno, which makes videos for amateur couples.

Cast

Production

Development
The genesis of Zack and Miri has been in Kevin Smith's mind since the 1990s. Two porn-centered projects were in development. One was a film called Name. It was intended to be a follow up (not a sequel) to Chasing Amy that would have starred the trio from that movie, Jason Lee, Ben Affleck, and Joey Lauren Adams and to be set in the View Askewniverse. But the project was not made, and was replaced with Dogma. The second attempt was in 1997 as a failed 22-episode series titled Hiatus. The series would have starred Lee again, and was about a man returning home after being away in California and leading a double life as a porn star. When he pitched the series to TV networks, they all rejected the idea believing that the kind of material handed to them can never happen on television. However, he kept the idea in mind and wrote a script following Clerks II that would be porn-bent.

Pre-production
According to Entertainment Weekly, The Weinstein Company greenlit the project based solely on the title. Kevin Smith originally wrote the film to be set in St.Cloud, Minnesota, where he had previously shot Mallrats, and where he had stated a desire to shoot again. However, for budgetary reasons, Smith opted to shoot in Pittsburgh, and re-wrote the script to take place in the suburb of Monroeville.

The female lead role was written for Rosario Dawson, but she was unable to accept the part, as she signed on to film Eagle Eye, whose shooting schedule would have conflicted with Smith's. Smith wrote the role of Zack with Seth Rogen in mind, based on his performance in The 40-Year-Old Virgin. Shooting concluded on March 12, 2008.

There are numerous references to Pittsburgh and the film's setting in the neighborhood of Monroeville and Pittsburgh throughout the film, including a drunken Steelers fan, a Penguins Stanley Cup flag, Miri sleeping in a Penguins jersey and the cast drinking Iron City Beer throughout the film. A scene is set outside Mellon Arena during a hockey game. The scene of the goalie body checking the defender was filmed at the Rostraver Ice Garden, about 45 minutes from Pittsburgh, with Ice Garden's own 'Bo' as the ref.  Another scene in the film was shot at the Monroeville Mall and contains a cameo appearance by Tom Savini. The mall was the setting of Dawn of the Dead, for which Savini was an effects artist. About the scene, Smith said, "We got to shoot at the Monroeville Mall, and for a movie buff, that's a very cool thing. We had Tom Savini [in cameo], we shot at the Monroeville Mall, it's as close to a zombie movie as I'll ever get." In the film, Zack plays hockey, and his team's name is the Monroeville Zombies, which is another reference to the George A. Romero film. One of the main cast members also has Pittsburgh-area roots: porn star icon Traci Lords (who played Bubbles in the film) is a native of Steubenville, Ohio, located about a half-hour drive west of Pittsburgh.

Distribution
While Metro-Goldwyn-Mayer was originally set to distribute the film, The Weinstein Company solely distributed the film after a deal between the two companies fell through. With the announcement came the removal of the MGM logo from the advertising for the film, which is the first Weinstein film to be released after the deal was abruptly ended before the scheduled January 2009 date.

Rating
The Motion Picture Association of America initially gave the film an NC-17 rating for "some graphic sexuality". Smith submitted two additional cuts of the film with certain footage removed and was told the movie was getting much closer to an "R" rating, but that he should remove a small 14-frame shot first. Smith felt that the scene should stay in so he appealed the rating and the film was again screened by the MPAA. Seth Rogen commented "It's a really filthy movie. I hear they are having some problems getting an R rating from an NC-17 rating, which is never good." He continued, complaining that "They fight against sex stuff. Isn't that weird? It's really crazy to me that Hostel is fine, with people gouging their eyes out and shit like that ... But you can't show two people having sex—that's too much". On August 5, the rating was successfully appealed to an R with no further cuts. It attained the rating for "strong crude sexual content including dialogue, graphic nudity and pervasive language".

On October 10, 2008, the British Board of Film Classification issued an 18 certificate for the film, saying it "contains very strong language and sex references and strong sex."

Marketing

On May 30, 2008, the first teaser trailer for the film was released on Smith's website, silentbobspeaks.com. The teaser depicts Rogen and Banks' characters as they hold auditions. In his online diary, Kevin Smith insisted it was strictly a teaser, mentioning, "There ain't a frame of footage in this puppy that's in the actual flick, so feel free to watch it without fear of 'spoilers'. This is just a little something to give you a bit of a feel for the flick." On July 21, however, the video was removed from the website following an order by the MPAA because it was designated a "teaser trailer" without passing through MPAA certification. On September 2, 2008, a red-band (R-rated) trailer of the film was released at IGN.

A poster for the film released in September 2008, which suggests the title characters are performing oral sex on each other, was prohibited for use in US theaters by the MPAA. The poster used in the US lampoons the film's explicit subject matter by featuring stick figures, with the explanation in the poster's text this is the only image that can be shown.

Despite this restriction, many media outlets refused to run the poster, or any ad that includes the word "porno" in the title, including a number of newspapers, TV stations, cable channels, and city governments, some of which responded to complaints about the ads at baseball stadiums and city bus stops. Many theaters displayed the film's title on their marquee as merely Zack and Miri. Weinstein Company marketing head Gary Faber stated that the ad was accepted in most of the outlets that were offered it, but that the studio would consider variations of the title for outlets that rejected it, including one version of the poster without the title that bears the slogan, "Seth Rogen and Elizabeth Banks made a movie so outrageous that we can't even tell you the title."

On November 10, 2008, The Weinstein Company announced that it would be re-launching the U.S. ad campaign for the film, with the main focus being a new poster that featured Rogen and Banks in a meadow with animals rendered in the style of children's animated cartoons. However, the new poster also took a jab at the controversy surrounding the image of the second poster—namely the controversy surrounding the use of the word "porno" in an image so seemingly kid-friendly—by including the statement "A poster for everyone who finds our movie title hard to swallow".

Release
The film opened  behind High School Musical 3: Senior Year with $10.7million from 2,735 theaters, an average of $3,906 per theater. The bankable Rogen experienced his "worst box-office opening ever". In an interview with Katla McGlynn of the Huffington Post, Smith himself observed:

During its 13 weeks in release, the film grossed $42.8million worldwide. Following the box office disappointment, Kevin Smith's relationship with producer Harvey Weinstein soured: "An associate says Smith bitterly blamed Harvey Weinstein for failing to spend enough to market the film. Although Weinstein said he spent $30million on marketing, Smith didn't believe he had followed through. Either way, the relationship between the two frayed."

Reception

Film review aggregator Rotten Tomatoes reports that 65% of critics gave the film a positive review, based on 199 reviews, with an average score of 6.20/10. The site's consensus reads: "Zack and Miri Make a Porno is a modest success for Kevin Smith, due in large part to the charm of Seth Rogen and Elizabeth Banks." On Metacritic, the film has a score of 56 out of 100, based on 33 critics, indicating "mixed or average reviews".

Michael Phillips of the Chicago Tribune said the film "pushes its R rating pretty hard, though as with most Smith characters this side of Silent Bob, there's a lot more raunch in the talk — the sheer, voluminous, often hilarious verbosity — than in the action." A. O. Scott says Smith "has been tinkering with the dirty-mind/soft-heart combination for quite some time, forming a link of sorts between the humanist sexual anarchy of John Waters and the smutty Victorianism of Judd Apatow." According to Scott:

[I]n spite of an avalanche of verbal filth (and a smaller quantum of the visual variety), Zack and Miri is not very shocking at all. He and his characters revel in dialogue that riffs on body parts and bodily fluids, but Mr. Smith's stories are bathed – metaphorically! – in syrup and schmaltz. So Zack and Miri Make a Porno, in spite of its sometimes tiresome, sometimes amusing lewdness, follows a gee-whiz romantic-comedy formula that would not be out of place on the Disney Channel. Two best friends who have always been in love with each other discover that ... they have always been in love with each other. Granted, this revelation occurs while they are having sex in front of a camera, but it is so sweet and predictable that these potentially tawdry circumstances hardly matter.

Roger Ebert of the Chicago Sun-Times gave the film 3 out of 4 stars and stated that, "Somehow Kevin Smith's very excesses defuse the material. He's like the guy at a party who tells dirty jokes so fast, Dangerfield-style, that you laugh more at the performance than the material."

Smith's views in retrospect
Both Smith and producer Scott Mosier were disappointed by the film's poor box office performance; according to Smith:

That was supposed to be the one that punched us through to the next level. Everyone thought it would do $60 to $70million, and it wound up doing Kevin Smith business. I was like, "I'm done." If I were to write at that point in my life, it would be about the poor fat kid whose movie didn't make enough money.

For two months after the film's theatrical release, Smith did not work. He even stayed away from the Internet. Smith was "convinced the film would grasp a piece of the raunchy-comedy box-office success that had flowed freely to Judd Apatow the previous year for Knocked Up"; when it did not, Smith criticized Harvey Weinstein for not spending enough to market the movie, an allegation Weinstein denied, noting he spent $30million marketing the film.

More than two years after the film was released, Smith said Zack and Miri is "literally me adulterating my own story ... the story of how I made Clerks, with porn."

Justin Long appears as a lawyer in Jay and Silent Bob Reboot. Smith confirmed that Long was reprising his role as Brandon and that the move was meant to retcon the earlier film into the View Askewniverse. Long's character was not named because Smith does not own the rights to Zack and Miri.

Soundtrack
The Zack and Miri Make a Porno soundtrack features audio clips and music from the 2008 comedy.  Another version of the soundtrack is available with the removal of all of the audio clips. This alternate version only has twelve tracks.

Track listing 

 "The Idea Comes...Hard" (film dialog) – Seth Rogen, Elizabeth Banks  – 0:06
 "Wynona's Big Brown Beaver" – Primus  – 4:22
 "Sex and Candy" – Marcy Playground  – 2:51
 "Steal My Sunshine" – Len  – 3:31
 "Salutations" (film dialog) – Elizabeth Banks, Justin Long, Brandon Routh, Seth Rogen  – 0:21
 "Smalltown Boy" – Bronski Beat  – 4:05
 "The Rosie Defense" (film dialog) – Elizabeth Banks, Seth Rogen  – 0:12
 "Just Like Honey" – The Jesus and Mary Chain  – 3:00
 "The Money Montage" – James L. Venable  – 6:16
 "Star Whores" (film dialog) – Jason Mewes, Seth Rogen, Elizabeth Banks, Craig Robinson  – 0:19
 "Fett's Vette" – mc chris  – 3:24
 "Meet the Producer" (film dialog) – Craig Robinson  – 0:35
 "Dreaming" – Blondie  – 3:05
 "Delaney's Lament" (film dialog) – Seth Rogen, Craig Robinson  – 0:13
 "Party Up (Up in Here)" – DMX  – 4:29
 "Hey" – Pixies  – 3:31
 "The Worst Porno You've Ever Seen" (film dialog) – Jeff Anderson, Seth Rogen, Elizabeth Banks, Craig Robinson  – 0:21
 "You and I Are a Gang of Losers" – The Dears  – 4:51
 "Ain't Love Grand" (film dialog) – Jeff Anderson, Craig Robinson, Tisha Campbell-Martin  – 0:12
 "I Love You" – Climax Blues Band  – 4:02
 "The Dutch Rudder" (film dialog) – Jason Mewes, Seth Rogen  – 0:23
 "We Don't Have to Take Our Clothes Off" – Jermaine Stewart  – 4:39
 "Parting Shot" (film dialog) – Seth Rogen, Elizabeth Banks  – 0:18

Notes 
A song by the band Live titled "Hold Me Up", which Smith has said he has been trying to use for over 13 years, appears in an "emotional scene" with Zack and Miri. Smith made a statement about featuring the song in the film:

The song does not appear on the soundtrack CD, and would not be available on a commercial release for another decade until Live announced a 25th-anniversary reissue of Throwing Copper, with "Hold Me Up" as a bonus track.

An original song by mc chris called "Miri and Zack" was made for the film. An older song by mc chris, "Fett's Vette", was also used in the film, as well as "Sex and Candy" by Marcy Playground and Jermaine Stewart's 1986 hit "We Don't Have to Take Our Clothes Off."

Home media
Although some copies of the February 2009 "2-Disc Edition" DVD were originally released under its full intended title in the United States, some DVDs were released under Zack and Miri, the censored title used to originally promote the film. The censored cover features a white background with a photo montage of the principal actors in the film; it includes a series of shorts called Money Shots, as well as other exclusive content; it contains no director's commentary, the first of Smith's films not to include one. The DVD also features 94 minutes of deleted scenes.

Connection to the View Askewniverse
At the time of its release, Kevin Smith claimed the film did not take place in the View Askewniverse, and consciously tried to avoid any connections: View Askewniverse staples Jay and Silent Bob make no appearance, and Smith went so far as to not feature the Nails cigarette brand that was a recurring brand in the films. Smith later changed his mind by featuring Justin Long in an uncredited cameo appearance as Brandon St. Randy in Jay and Silent Bob Reboot as Jay and Silent Bob and Saban Films' lawyer. Though the character is never named, due to being owned by the Weinstein Company, Smith confirmed this appearance is him retroactively adding Zack and Miri Make a Porno to the View Askewniverse.

References

External links

 
 
 
 
 

2000s English-language films
2008 romantic comedy films
2000s sex comedy films
2008 films
American romantic comedy films
American sex comedy films
Class reunions in popular culture
Fictional married couples
Films about pornography
Films scored by James L. Venable
Films directed by Kevin Smith
Films set in Pennsylvania
Films set in Pittsburgh
Films shot in Pittsburgh
Films with screenplays by Kevin Smith
The Weinstein Company films
View Askew Productions films
Films produced by Scott Mosier
2000s American films